Sean Ellis (born 1970) is a British film director, writer, producer and fashion photographer. He is best known for his films Cashback (2004), The Broken (2008), Metro Manila (2013), in the Tagalog language, and Anthropoid (2016).

Career 
In 2006, he was nominated for an Academy Award in the category "Best Short Film, Live Action" for his film, Cashback. The feature film was produced more than a year after the original 2004 short film was completed. Following a decision in December 2005 to proceed with the feature, Ellis completed the expanded script in seven days. After getting commitments from his cast in March he secured financing and the film went into production in May. This schedule was exceedingly condensed by modern film making standards.
	
His next major film, The Broken, premiered on 18 January 2008 as part of the 2008 Sundance Film Festival. It also was the first choice in Horrorfest 2009 and was part of the Sitges Film Festival 2008.

In 2011 he published the photography book Kubrick the Dog, which he began compiling as a way to deal with his dog's death from canine lymphoma.

Ellis resides in London, England.

Awards 
Metro Manila picked up three trophies at the 2013 British Independent Film Awards, taking Best British Independent Film, Best Director for Sean Ellis, and Best Achievement in Production.

Filmography

References

External links 

1970 births
Living people
Photographers from Sussex
British filmmakers
British film directors
British male screenwriters
British film producers